First Reformed is a 2017 American psychological drama film written and directed by Paul Schrader. It stars Ethan Hawke, Amanda Seyfried, and Cedric Kyles, and follows a Protestant minister (Hawke) struggling with his faith while serving as pastor of a dwindling historic church in upstate New York.

First Reformed was screened at the 74th Venice International Film Festival on August 31, 2017, and was released in the United States on May 18, 2018, by A24. The film was acclaimed by critics, who gave specific praise to Hawke's performance and Schrader's screenplay and direction. First Reformed was chosen by both the National Board of Review and American Film Institute as one of the top 10 films of 2018. Schrader's screenplay won at the Critics' Choice Awards, and was nominated at both the Independent Spirit Awards and the Academy Awards. At the Independent Spirit Awards, First Reformed also received nominations for Best Film, Best Director; it won Best Male Lead for Hawke.

Plot
Ernst Toller is the pastor of the First Reformed Church in Snowbridge, New York, who is struggling with a crisis of faith. The film opens with him writing down his thoughts in a journal, which he plans to keep for a year, and then destroy.

The church is a 250-year-old Dutch Reformed Church and was once a stop on the Underground Railroad. It faces dwindling attendance, so the church has moved away from its historical focus on Calvinist theology and now serves mostly as a tourist attraction. Toller, a former military chaplain, is struggling with alcoholism and the death of his son Joseph, who was killed in the Iraq War. Toller seeks a deeper spiritual understanding through reading Roman Catholic writers (G. K. Chesterton and Thomas Merton) and mystical books (The Cloud of Unknowing). This leads him to seek support from Abundant Life, the evangelical megachurch in Albany that owns First Reformed.

He is approached by Mary, who is seeking counseling for Michael, her radical-environmentalist husband. Michael further challenges Toller's beliefs: he wants Mary to get an abortion, because he does not want to bring a child into a world that will be rendered almost uninhabitable by climate change.

Mary finds a suicide vest belonging to her husband in their garage. Toller takes it, promising to counsel Michael about it. They discuss going to the police, but Toller feels it would worsen Michael's state. Just before their next appointment, Michael sends him a text message asking to meet in a local park. Toller arrives to find Michael dead of a self-inflicted shotgun wound. In accordance with Michael's will and testament, a service is held at a local toxic-waste dump, where his ashes are scattered.

Meanwhile, plans are underway to celebrate the 250th anniversary of First Reformed with a service attended by the mayor, the governor, and Edward Balq, one of Abundant Life's key financial backers and the owner of a polluting factory. At a meeting in a diner, Balq takes issue with Toller honoring Michael's will, deeming it a political act, and they argue over climate change: Balq dismisses it as "complicated", but Toller sees it as a straightforward matter of Christian stewardship.

Experiencing physical pain, Toller reluctantly sees a doctor, who suspects stomach cancer and schedules some tests. Toller has Michael's laptop computer, which he took after Michael's suicide to prevent the police from discovering his radicalism and making trouble for Mary. He uses it to research Michael's concerns, including the materials on Balq's factory which inspired him to make the explosive vest. One night, Mary visits Toller in the parsonage of the church, and she asks him to play Michael's role in a nonsexual rite of physical intimacy the couple used to perform.

Toller begs Mary not to attend the anniversary service. Preparing for his role in the ceremony, he puts on the explosive vest, and arms it. When he sees her entering the church, he removes the vest and instead wraps himself in barbed wire under his alb. Toller pours a glass full of drain cleaner and is about to drink it when Mary interrupts him. They embrace, kissing passionately before the film abruptly cuts to black.

Cast
 Ethan Hawke as Pastor Ernst Toller, leader of a tiny historic church who is going through several personal crises
 Amanda Seyfried as Mary Mensana, a pregnant widow and parishioner at First Reformed
 Cedric Kyles as Pastor Joel Jeffers, megachurch pastor at the evangelical Abundant Life church
 Victoria Hill as Esther, a worker at Abundant Life who is in love with Toller
 Philip Ettinger as Michael Mensana, a radical environmentalist and anti-natalist whose suicide emboldens Toller
 Michael Gaston as Edward Balq, local industrialist and financier of Abundant Life
 Bill Hoag as John Elder, church organist at First Reformed  (Performed by William E. Gati on the organ for Music Department and Soundtrack)

Production
The film is a return to a restrained style that Schrader first identified in his 1972 book Transcendental Style in Film about the works of Yasujiro Ozu, Robert Bresson, and Carl Th. Dreyer. Elements of the script allude to Bresson's Diary of a Country Priest (1951), Ingmar Bergman's Winter Light (1963), and the work of Dreyer, as well as Schrader's own script for Taxi Driver (1976). Schrader said he was inspired by Paweł Pawlikowski's film Ida (2013) to shoot in a 1.33:1 aspect ratio, saying "It ... drives the vertical lines, so you get more of the human body in the frame."

Before approaching Seyfriend, Schrader had discussed casting Michelle Williams in the role of Mary. First Reformed was filmed over the course of 20 days around Brooklyn and Queens, New York, including the building and grounds of the Zion Episcopal Church in Douglaston, Queens.

Release
In September 2017, A24 acquired distribution rights to the film. It was theatrically released in the United States on May 18, 2018. It has also screened in a number of film festivals, including those in New Zealand and Melbourne.

The screenplay will be published by Archway Editions in 2023 with an introduction by Masha Tupitsyn.

Reception

Box office
First Reformed grossed $100,270 from four theaters in its opening weekend, an average of $25,068 per venue, one of the best of Schrader's career. It went on to make $4 million worldwide.

Critical response
On Rotten Tomatoes, the film holds an approval rating of 94% based on 250 reviews, and an average rating of 8.3/10. The website's critical consensus reads: "Brought to life by delicate work from writer-director Paul Schrader and elevated by a standout performance by Ethan Hawke, First Reformed takes a sensitive and suspenseful look at weighty themes." On Metacritic, the film has a weighted average score of 85 out of 100, based on 48 critics, indicating "universal acclaim".

David Sims of The Atlantic called it "a tale of existential woe [...] an embittered look at our world through the eyes of someone who’s increasingly horrified to be a part of it, and a film that’s one of the most searing cinema experiences of the year." Peter Bradshaw of The Guardian said, "the sheer Bunyanesque severity of this film is as refreshing as a glass of ice-cold water ... a passionately focused film but not a masterpiece" and noted that Ethan Hawke's character's name was an allusion to the German playwright Ernst Toller. Michael Phillips of The Chicago Tribune stated that "for such a deliberate exercise in a specific, methodical style, First Reformed is oddly bracing, full of unresolved, contradictory, vital ideas."

Accolades

The film received nominations at the Independent Spirit Awards for Best Film, and Best Director and Best Screenplay for Schrader while winning the Best Male Lead for Hawke. At the Critics' Choice Movie Awards, the film received two nominations for Best Actor and Best Original Screenplay, winning in the latter. Schrader and Hawke were awarded Best Screenplay and Best Actor respectively at the Gotham Awards. Both the National Board of Review and American Film Institute listed it as one of the Top 10 Films of 2018, with the former's awarding Schrader the award for Best Original Screenplay. Schrader's screenplay also was nominated for an Academy Award, marking the first Oscar nomination of Schrader's long career.

References

External links

 
 
 
 
 

2017 films
2017 drama films
2017 thriller drama films
2010s English-language films
A24 (company) films
American pregnancy films
American thriller drama films
Eco-terrorism in fiction
Existentialist films
Films about abortion
Films about alcoholism
Films about cancer
Films about Christianity
Films about suicide
Films directed by Paul Schrader
2017 independent films
Films set in New York (state)
Films shot in New York City
Films with screenplays by Paul Schrader
Killer Films films
Climate change films
2010s American films